Jeremy Shada is an American actor, musician and singer. He is best known for his work as the voice of Finn the Human from the American animated television series Adventure Time and Lance in Voltron: Legendary Defender. He is also known for starring as various characters in the sketch-comedy series Incredible Crew. His most recent appearance is in the 2020 Netflix original television series Julie and the Phantoms, as Reggie Peters, one of four main cast members, including Charlie Gillespie, Owen Joyner, and Madison Reyes.

Life and career 
Shada began acting at the age of seven, soon after moving to Los Angeles with his family. He was inspired to act by his older brother, actor Zack Shada.

Shada initially appeared in commercials. Later on, he began auditioning for voice acting and theatrical performances, taking advice from a voice-over agent. His first live-action theatrical role was as Young Kurt Diamond in No Rules. He has since appeared in additional live-action and voice acting roles, such as playing young Charlie Pace in childhood flashbacks on Lost.

In 2009, Jeremy Shada's agent approached him with the idea of auditioning for the role of Finn in Adventure Time; his brother Zack had been the original voice of Finn in the pilot episode of Adventure Time three years prior. After viewing the pilot on YouTube, Shada matched his voice with the voice of his brother in auditions with Adventure Time creator Pendleton Ward and the show's producers, which earned him the role.

In 2012, Shada joined the cast of Nick Cannon's sketch-comedy series, Incredible Crew. In June 2012, to promote Incredible Crew's 2013 premiere, Cartoon Network released a music rap video titled "Running Errands with My Mom" which features Shada performing and rapping the lyrics. The video has since generated over one million views.

Because of his acting schedule, Shada was homeschooled. Answering fan questions on his Facebook page, Shada indicated that he graduated from high school early in May 2013.

Along with his brother Zack, Shada is a member of the pop-punk band Make Out Monday, which was formed in 2014. The band performed at the 2014 San Diego Comic-Con.

On March 8, 2020, Shada married Carolynn Rowland, a company dancer with Los Angeles Ballet.

Filmography

Discography

Studio albums

Soundtrack albums

Extended plays

Singles

Soundtrack appearances

References

External links 

 
 
 

Living people
American male bass guitarists
American male child actors
American male television actors
American male video game actors
American male voice actors
21st-century American bass guitarists
21st-century American male actors
21st-century American singers
21st-century American male singers
1997 births